Kamil Władysław Miazek (born 15 August 1996) is a Polish professional footballer who plays as a goalkeeper for Warta Sieradz.

Until 2020 he was at English club Leeds United. He was previously a player for the Poland U21s and Dutch side Feyenoord's academy.

Career 

After starting his career at GKS Bełchatów in Poland. Miazek earned a move to Dutch Eredivisie side Feyenoord in 2012, where he progressed through the academy.

Chojniczanka Chojnice
He joined Polish second division side Chojniczanka Chojnice from Feyenoord in 2016, he made four appearances for the side in a solitary season at the club, before being released.

Leeds United
Miazek joined Leeds United on trial towards the end of 2017 He impressed and signed a permanent deal at the club in January 2018. He joined the club's academy initially to feature with the Development squad. On 27 June 2018, Miazek signed a new contract at the club.

He made his first start for Leeds' first team when he started in their pre-season friendly 1–1 draw against York City on 20 July 2018, under new head coach Marcelo Bielsa.

On 24 November 2018, after injuries to Bailey Peacock-Farrell and Jamal Blackman, Miazek was named on the bench for the first time for the EFL Championship match against Bristol City. He returned to the bench on 30 March, for suspended goalkeeper Kiko Casilla, in the 3–2 home win over Millwall.

After a successful season with Leeds' under-23s, on 6 May 2019, Miazek saved two penalties (from Joe Redmond and Caolan Boyd-Munce) in a 4–2 penalty shootout (0–0 after extra time) versus Birmingham in the Professional Development League (Category 2) final. Jack Clarke then scored the winner for Leeds. On 18 May, Leeds announced that Miazek, together with reserve keeper, Will Huffer, had had their contracts extended by one year, with the club having taken up an automatic option on their existing contracts.

On 13 July 2019, Miazek was one of just 16 players named in Marcelo Bielsa's 1st team squad for Leeds' 2019–20 pre-season tour of Australia for matches against Manchester United and West Sydney Wanderers. He started the season as Leeds' second-choice goalkeeper after the sale of Bailey Peacock-Farrell.

After the English professional football season was paused in March 2020 due to Impact of the COVID-19 pandemic on association football, the season was resumed during June, where Miazek was part of the squad who earned promotion with Leeds to the Premier League and also become the EFL Championship Champions for the 2019–20 season in July after the successful resumption of the season. Miazek left Leeds in August 2020 when his contract wasn't renewed

International career
He has been capped for Poland at international level at Poland U19s and had received call-ups to Poland U20 as well as Poland U21s after being called up in May 2018.

Style of play
Miazek's goalkeeping style was described by the Yorkshire Evening Post as possessing "good reading of the game" and "willing to play the ball with his feet".

Career statistics

Honours
Leeds United
EFL Championship: 2019–20

References

External links 
90minut.pl profile

1996 births
Living people
Poland under-21 international footballers
Poland youth international footballers
Polish expatriate footballers
Association football goalkeepers
Leeds United F.C. players
English Football League players
Polish footballers
Expatriate footballers in England
Chojniczanka Chojnice players